Studies in Language Testing (SiLT) is a series of academic books containing papers in the fields of education and applied linguistics related to language testing and assessment.

It has been published by Cambridge English Language Assessment and Cambridge University Press and Cambridge English Language Assessment since 1995. The series editors are Lynda Taylor and Nick Saville.

Although each volume has a variety of purposes, 10 broad themes characterize the series:
 language testing terminology 
 language testing research methodology 
 test taker characteristics and language test performance 
 testing the four language skills 
 testing English for Academic Purposes: IELTS 
 test impact/washback 
 test comparability 
 test documenting 
 conference proceedings.

See also 
Association of Language Testers in Europe
Cambridge English Language Assessment
Cambridge University Press
Common European Framework of Reference

References

External links 
 

English as a second or foreign language
Publications established in 1995
Language education journals